Datis or Datus (Old Iranian: *Dātiya-, Achaemenid Elamite: Da-ti-ya), was a Median noble and admiral who served the Persian Empire during the reign of Darius the Great. He was familiar with Greek affairs and maintained connections with Greek leaders. He is noted for his joint leadership with the younger Artaphernes of the Persian forces in the first campaign of the Persian Wars against the Greeks.

Biography 
Before the Persian Wars Datis was a Persian commander during the Ionian Revolt. Datis led the counter-offensive against the Ionians in 494 BCE.

Datis and another officer named Artaphernes replaced a commander named Mardonius. Datis was ordered to reduce Athens and Eretria to slavery, and bring the Greek slaves before the Achaemenid king. To achieve this, Datis sought to establish a bridgehead on the eastern coast of Greece.

In 490 BCE,  Datis sailed from the Ionian shoreline to Samos, and then he travelled through the Icarian sea to the islands of Delos and Naxos. When Datis arrived the inhabitants of the islands fled. Datis then sent the inhabitants a message telling them he did not seek to harm them. Datis burnt large amounts of incense at the altar of Apollo.

Datis' forces travelled along the Greek coast taking town after town.  One town named Carystus resisted Datis. So his army of 80,000 soldiers and 200 triremes lay siege to the city. He began the siege by destroying the crops around the city. Eventually, the city was overwhelmed and surrendered.

During Datis's siege of Eretria in 490 BCE, the Eretrians had many conflicting strategies. Some Eretrians wished to surrender the city and wage guerrilla warfare in the mountains of Greece. Some Eretrians wanted to surrender the city to the Persians. Four thousand Athenian colonists arrived from Chalcis to help defend Eretria. Datis attacked the Eretrians in battle, resulting in high numbers of casualties. On the seventh day of the siege the Eretrians surrendered, and all of the temples in the city were burned to exact revenge for the earlier burning of Sardis by the Greeks. It is very likely one of the temples destroyed was the temple of Apollo Daphnephoros.

Datis commanded the Persian assault force against the Athenians at the Battle of Marathon in the same year. Ctesias of Cnidus relates that Datis was slain at Marathon and that the Athenians refused to hand over his body. However, this conflicts with Herodotus' claim that Datis survived the battle.

Family 
Datis had two sons named Harmamithres and Tithaeus. Both of his children became cavalry officers and served under Xerxes I.

References

External links
 Livius.org: Datis 

Year of death missing
Admirals of the Achaemenid Empire
5th-century BC deaths
Median people
Persian people of the Greco-Persian Wars
Battle of Marathon
Year of birth unknown
5th-century BC Iranian people
Generals of Darius the Great